Jack Denton Scott (1915 - 1995) was an American author who contributed to Reader's Digest for thirty years.
Born in Elkins, West Virginia, Scott started writing at the age of 16. He studied literature at Columbia University and University of Oxford.

He also worked as a war correspondent for an army newspaper. He also worked as the dogs editor for Field & Stream.

Bibliography 
 The Complete Book of Pasta: an Italian Cookbook (1968)
 Loggerhead Turtle: Survivor from the Sea (1974)
 Canada Geese (1976)
 Discovering the Mysterious Egret (1978)
 Island of Wild Horses (1978)
 Moose (1981)
 The Meat and Potatoes Cookbook (1988)
 Rice: A Cookbook (1989)

References

20th-century American writers
American war correspondents of World War II
People from Elkins, West Virginia
1915 births
1995 deaths
Columbia University alumni
Alumni of the University of Oxford
American expatriates in the United Kingdom
Writers from West Virginia